The Town of Ramsgate public house is located at the centre of the ancient hamlet of Wapping in the London Borough of Tower Hamlets. It features in several  books about London inns where it is rated as "a notable specimen of a waterman's tavern."

Construction
Although the present building dates back to 1758, the National Monuments Record have stated that it was constructed on earlier foundations. Today it benefits from a Grade II listing, awarded primarily for the pub's interior; the "beamed ceilings, benches, plank paneling and engraved glass screen" but also for its "group value and historical associations."

Despite later changes, the pub has a distinctive atmosphere. Crammed into a small rectangular area between Wapping Old Stairs and Oliver's Wharf, its fight for space is reflected in the long narrow shapes of the pub's main bar. Walking out onto the pub's riverside terrace, the visitor is confronted by the dramatic sight of narrow steps leading up to the mock gallows that loom against the skyline.

Nearby
To the left of the inn are the Georgian houses of Pier Head which were built in 1811 for the employees of the London Dock Company. The railed gardens cover the former entrance to Wapping Basin. Opposite the pub is St. John's Church. Built in 1790, all that remains is the tower, as the main body of the church was destroyed during the Blitz. To the right is Oliver's Wharf.

See also
 Prospect of Whitby
 List of restaurants in London

References

External links

Pubs in the London Borough of Tower Hamlets
Grade II listed buildings in the London Borough of Tower Hamlets
Restaurants in London
History of the London Borough of Tower Hamlets
Buildings and structures on the River Thames
Tourist attractions in the London Borough of Tower Hamlets
Grade II listed pubs in London
Wapping